Thalamoporella is a genus of bryozoans belonging to the family Thalamoporellidae.

The genus has cosmopolitan distribution.

Species:

Thalamoporella afrogothica 
Thalamoporella afrotubifera 
Thalamoporella airensis 
Thalamoporella andamanensis 
Thalamoporella arabiensis 
Thalamoporella arabiensis 
Thalamoporella archiaci 
Thalamoporella bifoliata 
Thalamoporella biperforata 
Thalamoporella bitorquata 
Thalamoporella burdigalensis 
Thalamoporella california 
Thalamoporella californica 
Thalamoporella chubbi 
Thalamoporella contiguacurva 
Thalamoporella cookae 
Thalamoporella delicata 
Thalamoporella dennanti 
Thalamoporella distorta 
Thalamoporella dizodoensis 
Thalamoporella domifera 
Thalamoporella dorothea 
Thalamoporella elongata 
Thalamoporella elongata 
Thalamoporella evelinae 
Thalamoporella falcifer
Thalamoporella falcifera 
Thalamoporella floridana 
Thalamoporella gilbertensis 
Thalamoporella gothica 
Thalamoporella gracilata 
Thalamoporella gracilis 
Thalamoporella granulata 
Thalamoporella hamata 
Thalamoporella harmelini 
Thalamoporella hastigera 
Thalamoporella hawaiiana 
Thalamoporella howchini 
Thalamoporella inaequalis 
Thalamoporella inarmata 
Thalamoporella indica 
Thalamoporella inornata 
Thalamoporella kachchhensis 
Thalamoporella karesansui 
Thalamoporella kharinadiensis 
Thalamoporella komodoensis 
Thalamoporella labiata 
Thalamoporella lanceolata 
Thalamoporella lata 
Thalamoporella linearis 
Thalamoporella lingulata 
Thalamoporella lioticha 
Thalamoporella longirostrata 
Thalamoporella mayori 
Thalamoporella minigothica 
Thalamoporella minuta 
Thalamoporella molokaiensis 
Thalamoporella neogenica 
Thalamoporella novaehollandiae 
Thalamoporella ocalana 
Thalamoporella ogivalis 
Thalamoporella papalis 
Thalamoporella parviavicularia 
Thalamoporella polygonalis 
Thalamoporella prima 
Thalamoporella prominens 
Thalamoporella quadrata 
Thalamoporella rasmuhammadi 
Thalamoporella reniformis 
Thalamoporella rhombifera 
Thalamoporella rozieri 
Thalamoporella semitorquata 
Thalamoporella setosa 
Thalamoporella sibogae 
Thalamoporella sinensis 
Thalamoporella sparsipunctata 
Thalamoporella spathulata 
Thalamoporella spinosa 
Thalamoporella spiravicula 
Thalamoporella stapifera 
Thalamoporella sulawesiensis 
Thalamoporella tewarii 
Thalamoporella transversa 
Thalamoporella trepoculata 
Thalamoporella trimulla 
Thalamoporella tubifera 
Thalamoporella vavauensis 
Thalamoporella victoriensis 
Thalamoporella vinjhanensis 
Thalamoporella voigti 
Thalamoporella winstonae 
Thalamoporella wynnei

References

Bryozoan genera